Hughes Mill is an unincorporated community in Placer County, California. It lies at an elevation of 3,510 feet (1,070 m).

References

Unincorporated communities in California
Unincorporated communities in Placer County, California